Blairstown is an unincorporated community in East Feliciana Parish, Louisiana, United States.

Etymology
It is speculated that the community is named after John Insley Blair. In the fall of 1866 a Presbyterian missionary named Rev. John Arndt Reiley migrated to the community from Blairstown, New Jersey.

References

Unincorporated communities in East Feliciana Parish, Louisiana
Unincorporated communities in Louisiana